The Harpactorinae are a large subfamily of the Reduviidae (assassin bugs). About 300 genera and 2,000 species worldwide have been described. Some of the species of the genera Zelus, Pselliopus, Sinea, and Apiomerus are of interest as biological pest control agents.

Tribes and genera
The genera of six tribes include:

Apiomerini

New World resin bugs: auth. Amyot & Audinet-Serville, 1843
Agriocleptus Stål, 1866
Agriocoris Stål, 1866
Amauroclopius Stål, 1868
Apiomerus Hahn, 1831
Beharus Fabricius, 1803
Calliclopius Stål, 1868
Foucartus Berenger, 2006
Heniartes Spinola, 1840
Manicocoris Fabricius, 1787
Micrauchenus Amyot & Servile, 1843
Ponerobia Amyot & Serville, 1843
Sphodrolestes Stål, 1866

Diaspidiini
African resin bugs: auth. Miller, 1959
 Cleontes Stål, 1874
 Diaspidius Westwood, 1837
 Rodhainiella Schouteden, 1913

Dicrotelini
Asia, Australia; auth. Stål, 1859.  Approximately 13 genera including:
 type genus - Dicrotelus Erichson, 1842

Ectinoderini
Oriental resin bugs: auth. Stål, 1859

 Amulius Stål, 1866
 Ectinoderus Westwood, 1845

Harpactorini

A partial list of genera in this tribe includes:
 Acholla Stål, 1862
 Arilus Hahn, 1831
 Atrachelus Amyot and Serville, 1843
 Castolus Stål, 1858
 Camptibia Cai, 2003
 Coranus Curtis, 1833
 Doldina Stål, 1859
 Euagoras Burmeister, 1835
 Eulyes  Amyot & Serville, 1843
 Fitchia Stål, 1859
 Harpactor Laporte, 1833
 Harpactorella - monotypic Harpactorella frederici Wygodzinsky, 1946
 Heza Amyot and Serville, 1843
 Irantha Stål, 1861
 Liangcoris Zhao, Cai & Ren, 2007
 Nagusta Stål, 1859
 Pahabengkakia Miller, 1941
 Pselliopus Bergroth, 1905
 Repipta Stål, 1859
 Rhynocoris Hahn, 1834
 Rocconota Stål, 1859
 Sinea Amyot and Serville, 1843
 Sphedanolestes Stål
 Sycanus Amyot and Serville, 1843
 Zelus Fabricius, 1802
 Zostus Stål, 1874

Rhaphidosomatini
(synonym: Rhaphidosomini Distant, 1904)

 Hoffmannocoris China, 1940
 Leptodema De Carlini, 1892
 Rhaphidosoma Amyot & Serville, 1843
 Vibertiola Horvath, 1909 - southern Europe, NW Africa

Other Tribes
Tegeini (sometimes placed as subfamily Tegeinae)
 Phonolibes Stål, 1854 - SE Africa
 Tegea (insect) Stål, 1863 - Australia

References 

Reduviidae
Hemiptera subfamilies